Waleed Al-Yamahi (Arabic:وليد اليماحي) (born 19 November 1990) is an Emirati footballer who plays as a left back for Ajman Club.

External links

References

Emirati footballers
1990 births
Living people
Al Wahda FC players
Al Jazira Club players
Al Dhafra FC players
Baniyas Club players
Fujairah FC players
Ajman Club players
UAE First Division League players
UAE Pro League players
Association football defenders